Rebecca Ann Moros (born May 6, 1985) is an American soccer coach and former player who is currently the head coach for University of Arizona women's soccer team. A defender during her playing career, Moros played for the Utah Royals, Houston Dash and Portland Thorns FC in the NWSL, INAC Kobe Leonessa in Japan's Nadeshiko League and for Washington Freedom and Western New York Flash in the Women's Professional Soccer.

Early life
Born in Manhattan, New York to Dr. Daniel Moros and Dr. Ann Schongalla, Moros attended Mamaroneck High School but only played her junior year for the school. Instead, she opted to play year-round soccer with club team, NYC FC, a team that won the Florida state championship two times. Moros led NYC FC to three Region I Championships and received All-League and All-Section honors in Summer of 2002 during her senior year.

Moros played on the New York Olympic Development Program (ODP) state team from 1998–2003 where she was a five-time member of the Region I Olympic Development Program (ODP) team. With the team, she was a U-19, U-17, U-16 Region I three-time champion and three-time bronze medalists at the nationals. During the summer of 2003, she played on the U-19 adidas Cup All-America squad.

Duke University
Moros attended Duke University. As a freshman in 2003, Moros played in 21 matches, earning a starting spot for the final 11. She scored three goals and provided two assists. She netted her first career goal in a 4–0 win over Richmond and assisted the game-winning goal against Virginia in the ACC Tournament.

During her sophomore year, Moros started all 23 games and led the team with 11 assists, tied for second-most in Duke single-season history. She set a Duke single-game record four assists versus Virginia Tech. Moros garnered Soccer Buzz second team and NSCAA third team All-Southeast Region honors and was selected as second team All-ACC. She received All-America honors from the Jewish Sports Review and was a member of Duke/adidas Soccer Classic All-Tournament Team.

As a junior, Moros played in all 21 matches for the Blue Devils, starting 20. She scored four goals and provided four assists. She earned Soccer Buzz All-America honorable mention honors and Soccer Buzz All-Southeast Region first team honors and was selected to the NSCAA All-Southeast Region second team and All-ACC first team. Moros was named Soccer America Team of the Week, Soccer Buzz Team of the Week, and ACC Player of the Week. She was selected to Duke/adidas Classic All-Tournament Team and netted two game-winning goals versus San Diego and top-ranked North Carolina.

During her senior year, Moros started in all 21 matches scoring four goals and assisting on three others for 11 points (ranking fourth on the team in points). She earned NSCAA/adidas Third Team All-America honors and was named to Soccer Buzz Second Team All-Region and All-ACC first team. She also received All-Tournament Team honors at both the UAB Nike Classic and Duke Classic.

Club career

Washington Freedom
After playing two seasons with the Washington Freedom W-League team, Moros was selected in the sixth round (36th overall) of the 2009 WPS Draft by the Washington Freedom for the inaugural season of the WPS. She made 20 appearances, with 14 starts for a total of 1,221 minutes and scored two goals.

Moros returned to the Freedom for the 2010 WPS season. She started all 24 of her appearances for a total of 2,201 minutes and scored one goal.

magicJack
The Washington Freedom came under new ownership in 2011, getting moved to Florida and re-branded as magicJack. Moros remained with the team for the start of the 2011 WPS season, making five appearances with three starts. She was then traded to the Western New York Flash.

Western New York Flash
During the remainder of the 2011 WPS season, Moros made ten appearances for the Western New York Flash with nine starts for a total of 864 minutes.  She scored one goal and helped the Flash win the 2011 Women's Professional Soccer Playoffs.

Sky Blue FC
In 2012, Moros signed with Sky Blue FC; however, the league suspended operations before the season began.

INAC Kobe Leonessa 
After the folding of the WPS, Moros joined INAC Kobe Leonessa in Japan.

Portland Thorns FC, 2014 
In 2014 Portland Thorns FC acquired Jessica McDonald and the rights to Moros from the Seattle Reign FC in exchange for Danielle Foxhoven. Both players proved mainstays for the team from early on, with Moros playing a total of 1171 minutes over 18 games with 13 starts in the regular season.

FC Kansas City, 2015 
In January 2015, Portland traded Moros to FC Kansas City for an additional international roster spot. She started all 20 regular-season games for FCKC in the 2015 season.

Houston Dash, 2016 
In November 2015, FC Kansas City traded Moros to the Western New York Flash for defender Brittany Taylor. In March 2016 Houston Dash acquired Moros from Western New York Flash for a second-round pick in the 2017 NWSL College Draft pick.

FC Kansas City, 2017 
In March 2017, Moros was traded back to FC Kansas City from the Houston Dash in exchange for their highest third round draft choice in the 2018 NWSL College Draft.

Utah Royals FC, 2018–2019 
After FC Kansas City ceased operations after the 2017 season, Moros was officially added to the roster of the Utah Royals FC for the 2018 season. Moros was named to the NWSL Team of the Month for June.

Following two seasons with the Utah Royals, Moros was waived by the club on February 3, 2020. She made 30 appearances over her two years with Utah.

Head coaching record

References

External links
 Official website
 NWSL player profile
 Duke player profile
 
 

1985 births
Living people
American expatriate women's soccer players
American expatriate sportspeople in Japan
American women's soccer players
Arizona Wildcats women's soccer coaches
Duke Blue Devils women's soccer players
Expatriate women's footballers in Japan
FC Kansas City players
Houston Dash players
INAC Kobe Leonessa players
MagicJack (WPS) players
Mamaroneck High School alumni
Nadeshiko League players
National Women's Soccer League players
Portland Thorns FC players
Sportspeople from Manhattan
Soccer players from New York City
Utah Royals FC players
Washington Freedom players
Western New York Flash players
Women's association football midfielders
Women's Professional Soccer players
NJ/NY Gotham FC non-playing staff